Tricolia retrolineata is a species of sea snail, a marine gastropod mollusk in the family Phasianellidae.

Description

Distribution
 southern Mozambique
 northeastern South Africa

References

Phasianellidae
Gastropods described in 2008